Nay Pyi Taw Football Club was a professional football club based at Wunna Theikdi Stadium in Nay Pyi Taw, Myanmar. Owned by a prominent businessman, Dr. Phyo Ko Ko Tint San, the club was founded in 2010 and finished as runners-up in MNL Cup 2012.

Nay Pyi Taw F.C. played as semi-professional club (ACE FC) in the Myanmar League, which was the highest football league in Myanmar. The first ever manager was Zaw Win, and the coach was San Lwin. Since 2010, Nay Pyi Taw Football Club changed as a professional football club to play in the Myanmar National League, which was changed from Myanmar League.

History
Nay Pyi Taw FC is a Myanmar professional football team, established in 2010. While initially based in Yangon, the team was relocated to the capital Nay Pyi Taw in 2011. In that year, Nay Pyi Taw FC football team renovated the Paung Laung Stadium as a modern 15,000 capacity stadium and uses it as its home field.

Nay Pyi Taw FC won by 6 goals over Zwegabin United FC (April 5, 2010) as their first ever professional football match win. Their first ever professional hat-trick goal was produced by Aruna who scored his first professional goal against Zwegabin United FC. The 2013 Myanmar National League was a breakthrough season for the club where the team finished as runners-up, its highest position ever, and qualified for the 2014 AFC Cup.

Performance in AFC Cup

2014
Nay Pyi Taw FC has qualified for the 2014 AFC Cup and is placed in Group H comprising Kitchee FC from Hong Kong, Tampines Rovers FC from Singapore and Pune FC from India. This is Nay Pyi Taw FC's first foray in Asian level competition. Nay Pyi Taw have progressed to the AFC Cup Round of 16 where they will meet Hanoi T&T in a one off game to see who progresses to the Quarter-finals of the AFC Cup.

Group H

Sponsorship

Final squad

Seasons

References

External links
 

Football clubs in Myanmar
Association football clubs established in 2010
Myanmar National League clubs
2010 establishments in Myanmar